Pak Song-chol is a North Korean footballer who plays as a forward for April 25.

References

External links 
 

Living people
1991 births
Association football forwards
North Korean footballers
North Korea international footballers